Hexorthodes is a genus of moths of the family Noctuidae.

Species
 Hexorthodes accurata (H. Edwards, 1882)
 Hexorthodes agrotiformis (Grote, 1881) (syn: Hexorthodes planalis (Grote, 1883), Hexorthodes diplopis (Dyar, 1914), Hexorthodes aleuca (Draudt, 1924))
 Hexorthodes catalina (Barnes & McDunnough, 1912)
 Hexorthodes citeria Blanchard & Knudson, 1985
 Hexorthodes emendata Blanchard & Knudson, 1985
 Hexorthodes inconspicua (Grote, 1883)
 Hexorthodes jocosa (Barnes & McDunnough, 1916)
 Hexorthodes nipana (Smith, 1910) (syn: Hexorthodes montara (Smith, 1910))
 Hexorthodes oriza (Druce, 1889)
 Hexorthodes senatoria (Smith, 1900)
 Hexorthodes serrata (Smith, 1900)
 Hexorthodes tuana (Smith, 1906)

Former species
 Hexorthodes alamosa is now Hypotrix alamosa (Barnes, 1904)
 Hexorthodes hueco is now Hypotrix hueco (Barnes, 1904)
 Hexorthodes optima is now Hypotrix optima (Dyar, [1920])
 Hexorthodes trifascia is now Hypotrix trifascia (Smith, 1891)

References
Natural History Museum Lepidoptera genus database
Hexorthodes at funet

Hadeninae